The Geraniales are a small order of flowering plants, in the rosid subclade of eudicots. The largest family in the order is Geraniaceae with over 800 species. In addition, the order includes the smaller Francoaceae with about 40 species. Most Geraniales are herbaceous, but there are also shrubs and small trees.

Flower morphology of the Geraniales is rather conserved. They are usually perfectly pentamerous and pentacyclic without fused organs besides the carpels of the superior gynoecium. The androecium is obdiplostemonous. Only a few genera are tetramerous (Francoa, Tetilla, Melianthus). In some genera some stamens (Pelargonium) or a complete whorl of stamens are reduced (Erodium, Melianthus). In the genera Hypseocharis and Monsonia there are 15 instead of the usual ten stamens. Most genera bear nectariferous flowers. The nectary glands are formed by the receptacle and are localised at the bases of the antesepalous stamens.

The anthophytes are a grouping of plant taxa bearing flower-like reproductive structures. They were formerly thought to be a clade comprising plants bearing flower-like structures.  The group contained the angiosperms - the extant flowering plants, such as roses and grasses - as well as the Gnetales and the extinct Bennettitales.

23,420 species of vascular plant have been recorded in South Africa, making it the sixth most species-rich country in the world and the most species-rich country on the African continent. Of these, 153 species are considered to be threatened. Nine biomes have been described in South Africa: Fynbos, Succulent Karoo, desert, Nama Karoo, grassland, savanna, Albany thickets, the Indian Ocean coastal belt, and forests.

The 2018 South African National Biodiversity Institute's National Biodiversity Assessment plant checklist lists 35,130 taxa in the phyla Anthocerotophyta (hornworts (6)), Anthophyta (flowering plants (33534)), Bryophyta (mosses (685)), Cycadophyta (cycads (42)), Lycopodiophyta (Lycophytes(45)), Marchantiophyta (liverworts (376)), Pinophyta (conifers (33)), and Pteridophyta (cryptogams (408)).

Two families are represented in the literature. Listed taxa include species, subspecies, varieties, and forms as recorded, some of which have subsequently been allocated to other taxa as synonyms, in which cases the accepted taxon is appended to the listing. Multiple entries under alternative names reflect taxonomic revision over time.

Geraniaceae
Family: Geraniaceae,

Erodium
Genus Erodium
 Erodium botrys (Cav.) Bertol. not indigenous, naturalised
 Erodium brachycarpum (Godr.) Thell. not indigenous, naturalised
 Erodium chium (L.) Willd. not indigenous, naturalised
 Erodium cicutarium (L.) L'Her. not indigenous, naturalised
 Erodium malacoides (L.) L'Her. subsp. malacoides, not indigenous, naturalised
 Erodium moschatum (L.) L'Her. not indigenous, naturalised, invasive

Geraniospermum
Genus Geraniospermum
 Geraniospermum carnosum (L.) Kuntze, accepted as Pelargonium carnosum (L.) L'Her. subsp. carnosum, indigenous
 Geraniospermum dipetalum (L'Her.) Kuntze, accepted as Pelargonium dipetalum L'Her. subsp. dipetalum 
 Geraniospermum ferulaceum (Cav.) Kuntze, accepted as Pelargonium carnosum (L.) L'Her. subsp. ferulaceum (Cav.) M.Becker & F.Albers, indigenous
 Geraniospermum nivenii (Harv.) Kuntze, accepted as Pelargonium dipetalum L'Her. subsp. dipetalum

Geranium
Genus Geranium
 Geranium amatolicum Hilliard & B.L.Burtt, endemic
 Geranium angustipetalum Hilliard & B.L.Burtt, endemic
 Geranium arabicum Forssk. indigenous
 Geranium arabicum Forssk. subsp. arabicum, endemic
 Geranium baurianum R.Knuth, endemic
 Geranium brycei N.E.Br. indigenous
 Geranium caffrum Eckl. & Zeyh. endemic
 Geranium canescens L'Her. endemic
 Geranium carnosum L. accepted as Pelargonium carnosum (L.) L'Her. subsp. carnosum, indigenous
 Geranium contortum Eckl. & Zeyh. endemic
 Geranium dipetalum (L'Her.) Poir. accepted as Pelargonium dipetalum L'Her. subsp. dipetalum 
 Geranium discolor Hilliard & B.L.Burtt, endemic
 Geranium dissectum L. not indigenous, naturalised, invasive
 Geranium drakensbergensis Hilliard & B.L.Burtt, indigenous
 Geranium dregei Hilliard & B.L.Burtt, endemic
 Geranium ferulaceum Cav. accepted as Pelargonium carnosum (L.) L'Her. subsp. ferulaceum (Cav.) M.Becker & F.Albers, indigenous
 Geranium flanaganii R.Knuth, indigenous
 Geranium grandistipulatum Hilliard & B.L.Burtt, endemic
 Geranium harveyi Briq. endemic
 Geranium incanum Burm.f. indigenous
 Geranium incanum Burm.f. var. incanum, endemic
 Geranium incanum Burm.f. var. multifidum (Sweet) Hilliard & B.L.Burtt, endemic
 Geranium magniflorum R.Knuth, indigenous
 Geranium molle L. not indigenous, naturalised, invasive
 Geranium multisectum N.E.Br. indigenous
 Geranium natalense Hilliard & B.L.Burtt, endemic
 Geranium nyassense R.Knuth, indigenous
 Geranium ornithopodioides Hilliard & B.L.Burtt, endemic
 Geranium ornithopodum Eckl. & Zeyh. endemic
 Geranium pulchrum N.E.Br. endemic
 Geranium purpureum Vill. not indigenous, naturalised, invasive
 Geranium robustum Kuntze, indigenous
 Geranium rotundifolium L. not indigenous, naturalised
 Geranium schlechteri R.Knuth, indigenous
 Geranium sparsiflorum R.Knuth, endemic
 Geranium subglabrum Hilliard & B.L.Burtt, endemic
 Geranium wakkerstroomianum R.Knuth, indigenous

Hoarea
Genus Hoarea
 Hoarea erythrophylla Eckl. & Zeyh. accepted as Pelargonium dipetalum L'Her. subsp. dipetalum

Monsonia
Genus Monsonia
 Monsonia angustifolia E.Mey. ex A.Rich. indigenous
 Monsonia attenuata Harv. indigenous
 Monsonia brevirostrata R.Knuth, indigenous
 Monsonia burkeana Planch. ex Harv. indigenous
 Monsonia camdeboensis (Moffett) F.Albers, endemic
 Monsonia ciliata (Moffett) F.Albers, endemic
 Monsonia crassicaulis (Rehm) F.Albers, indigenous
 Monsonia emarginata (L.f.) L'Her. endemic
 Monsonia flavescens (Rehm) F.Albers, indigenous
 Monsonia galpinii Schltr. ex R.Knuth, endemic
 Monsonia glauca R.Knuth, indigenous
 Monsonia grandifolia R.Knuth, endemic
 Monsonia herrei (L.Bolus) F.Albers, endemic
 Monsonia lanuginosa R.Knuth, endemic
 Monsonia luederitziana Focke & Schinz, indigenous
 Monsonia multifida E.Mey. indigenous
 Monsonia natalensis R.Knuth, endemic
 Monsonia parvifolia Schinz, indigenous
 Monsonia patersonii DC. indigenous
 Monsonia praemorsa E.Mey. ex R.Knuth, endemic
 Monsonia salmoniflora (Moffett) F.Albers, indigenous
 Monsonia senegalensis Guill. & Perr. indigenous
 Monsonia speciosa L. endemic
 Monsonia spinosa L'Her. endemic
 Monsonia transvaalensis R.Knuth, endemic
 Monsonia umbellata Harv. indigenous
 Monsonia vanderietiae (L.Bolus) F.Albers, endemic

Pelargonium
Genus Pelargonium
 Pelargonium abrotanifolium (L.f.) Jacq. endemic
 Pelargonium acetosum (L.) L'Her. endemic
 Pelargonium aciculatum E.M.Marais, endemic
 Pelargonium acraeum R.A.Dyer, indigenous
 Pelargonium adriaanii M.Becker & F.Albers, endemic
 Pelargonium aestivale E.M.Marais, endemic
 Pelargonium albersii M.Becker, indigenous
 Pelargonium album J.J.A.van der Walt, endemic
 Pelargonium alchemilloides (L.) L'Her. indigenous
 Pelargonium alpinum Eckl. & Zeyh. endemic
 Pelargonium alternans J.C.Wendl. indigenous
 Pelargonium alternans J.C.Wendl. subsp. alternans, endemic
 Pelargonium alternans J.C.Wendl. subsp. longicalcar M.Becker & F.Albers, endemic
 Pelargonium alternans J.C.Wendl. subsp. parviinflorescens M.Becker & F.Albers, endemic
 Pelargonium althaeoides (L.) L'Her. indigenous
 Pelargonium anethifolium (Eckl. & Zeyh.) Steud. endemic
 Pelargonium angustifolium (Thunb.) DC. accepted as Pelargonium longiflorum Jacq. present
 Pelargonium angustipetalum E.M.Marais, endemic
 Pelargonium antidysentericum (Eckl. & Zeyh.) Kostel. indigenous
 Pelargonium antidysentericum (Eckl. & Zeyh.) Kostel. subsp. antidysentericum, indigenous
 Pelargonium antidysentericum (Eckl. & Zeyh.) Kostel. subsp. inerme Scheltema, endemic
 Pelargonium antidysentericum (Eckl. & Zeyh.) Kostel. subsp. zonale Scheltema, endemic
 Pelargonium appendiculatum (L.f.) Willd. endemic
 Pelargonium aridicola E.M.Marais, endemic
 Pelargonium aridum R.A.Dyer, indigenous
 Pelargonium aristatum (Sweet) G.Don, endemic
 Pelargonium articulatum (Cav.) Willd. indigenous
 Pelargonium asarifolium (Sweet) Loudon, endemic
 Pelargonium astragalifolium (Cav.) Jacq. accepted as Pelargonium pinnatum (L.) L'Her. present
 Pelargonium attenuatum Harv. endemic
 Pelargonium auritum (L.) Willd. indigenous
 Pelargonium auritum (L.) Willd. subsp. auritum, accepted as Pelargonium auritum (L.) Willd. var. auritum, indigenous
 Pelargonium auritum (L.) Willd. subsp. carneum (Harv.) J.J.A.van der Walt, accepted as Pelargonium auritum (L.) Willd. var. carneum (Harv.) E.M.Marais, indigenous
 Pelargonium auritum (L.) Willd. var. auritum, indigenous
 Pelargonium auritum (L.) Willd. var. carneum (Harv.) E.M.Marais, indigenous
 Pelargonium barklyi Scott-Elliot, endemic
 Pelargonium bechuanicum Burtt Davy var. latisectum Burtt Davy, accepted as Pelargonium dolomiticum R.Knuth, indigenous
 Pelargonium betulinum (L.) L'Her. endemic
 Pelargonium bicolor (Jacq.) L'Her. endemic
 Pelargonium bifolium (Burm.f.) Willd. endemic
 Pelargonium bowkeri Harv. indigenous
 Pelargonium brevipetalum N.E.Br. endemic
 Pelargonium brevirostre R.A.Dyer, endemic
 Pelargonium bubonifolium (Andrews) Pers. indigenous
 Pelargonium burgerianum J.J.A.van der Walt, endemic
 Pelargonium burtoniae L.Bolus, endemic
 Pelargonium buysii Hellbr. endemic
 Pelargonium caespitosum Turcz. indigenous
 Pelargonium caespitosum Turcz. subsp. caespitosum, endemic
 Pelargonium caespitosum Turcz. subsp. concavum Hugo, endemic
 Pelargonium caffrum (Eckl. & Zeyh.) Harv. endemic
 Pelargonium caledonicum L.Bolus, endemic
 Pelargonium calviniae R.Knuth, endemic
 Pelargonium campestre (Eckl. & Zeyh.) Steud. endemic
 Pelargonium candicans Spreng. endemic
 Pelargonium capillare (Cav.) Willd. endemic
 Pelargonium capitatum (L.) L'Her. indigenous
 Pelargonium capituliforme R.Knuth, indigenous
 Pelargonium carneum Jacq. endemic
 Pelargonium carnosum (L.) L'Her. indigenous
 Pelargonium carnosum (L.) L'Her. subsp. carnosum, indigenous
 Pelargonium carnosum (L.) L'Her. subsp. ferulaceum (Cav.) M.Becker & F.Albers, indigenous
 Pelargonium caroli-henrici B.Nord. endemic
 Pelargonium caucalifolium Jacq. indigenous
 Pelargonium caucalifolium Jacq. subsp. caucalifolium, endemic
 Pelargonium caucalifolium Jacq. subsp. convolvulifolium (Schltr. ex R.Knuth) J.J.A.van der Walt, endemic
 Pelargonium cavanillesii Knuth, accepted as Pelargonium heterophyllum Jacq. present
 Pelargonium ceratophyllum L'Her. indigenous
 Pelargonium chamaedryfolium Jacq. endemic
 Pelargonium chelidonium (Houtt.) DC. endemic
 Pelargonium citronellum J.J.A.van der Walt, endemic
 Pelargonium columbinum Jacq. endemic
 Pelargonium confertum E.M.Marais, endemic
 Pelargonium connivens E.M.Marais, endemic
 Pelargonium conradieae J.C.Manning & A.Le Roux, endemic
 Pelargonium cordifolium (Cav.) Curtis, endemic
 Pelargonium coronopifolium Jacq. endemic
 Pelargonium crassicaule L'Her. indigenous
 Pelargonium crassipes Harv. endemic
 Pelargonium crinitum Harv. accepted as Pelargonium radiatum (Andrews) Pers. present
 Pelargonium crispum (P.J.Bergius) L'Her. endemic
 Pelargonium crithmifolium Sm. indigenous
 Pelargonium cucullatum (L.) L'Her. indigenous
 Pelargonium cucullatum (L.) L'Her. subsp. cucullatum, endemic
 Pelargonium cucullatum (L.) L'Her. subsp. strigifolium Volschenk, endemic
 Pelargonium cucullatum (L.) L'Her. subsp. tabulare Volschenk, endemic
 Pelargonium curviandrum E.M.Marais, endemic
 Pelargonium dasyphyllum E.Mey. ex R.Knuth, endemic
 Pelargonium denticulatum Jacq. endemic
 Pelargonium desertorum Vorster, endemic
 Pelargonium dichondrifolium DC. endemic
 Pelargonium dipetalum L'Her. indigenous
 Pelargonium dipetalum L'Her. subsp. dipetalum, endemic
 Pelargonium dipetalum L'Her. subsp. stenosiphon J.C.Manning & M.M.le Roux, endemic
 Pelargonium dispar N.E.Br. endemic
 Pelargonium divisifolium Vorster, endemic
 Pelargonium dolomiticum R.Knuth, indigenous
 Pelargonium echinatum Curtis, endemic
 Pelargonium elandsmontanum E.M.Marais ex J.C.Manning & Goldblatt, indigenous
 Pelargonium elegans (Andrews) Willd. endemic
 Pelargonium ellaphieae E.M.Marais, endemic
 Pelargonium elongatum (Cav.) Salisb. endemic
 Pelargonium englerianum R.Knuth, endemic
 Pelargonium ensatum (Thunb.) DC. accepted as Pelargonium auritum (L.) Willd. var. carneum (Harv.) E.M.Marais, present
 Pelargonium eupatoriifolium (Eckl. & Zeyh.) Steud. endemic
 Pelargonium exhibens Vorster, endemic
 Pelargonium exstipulatum (Cav.) L'Her. endemic
 Pelargonium fasciculaceum E.M.Marais, endemic
 Pelargonium fergusoniae L.Bolus, endemic
 Pelargonium fissifolium (Andrews) Pers. endemic
 Pelargonium flavidum E.M.Marais, endemic
 Pelargonium frutetorum R.A.Dyer, endemic
 Pelargonium fruticosum (Cav.) Willd. endemic
 Pelargonium fulgidum (L.) L'Her. endemic
 Pelargonium fumariifolium R.Knuth, indigenous
 Pelargonium gibbosum (L.) L'Her. endemic
 Pelargonium gilgianum Schltr. ex R.Knuth, endemic
 Pelargonium githagineum E.M.Marais, endemic
 Pelargonium glabriphyllum E.M.Marais, endemic
 Pelargonium glutinosum (Jacq.) L'Her. endemic
 Pelargonium gracile (Eckl. & Zeyh.) Steud. endemic
 Pelargonium gracilipes R.Knuth, endemic
 Pelargonium gracillimum Fourc. endemic
 Pelargonium grandicalcaratum R.Knuth, indigenous
 Pelargonium grandiflorum (Andrews) Willd. endemic
 Pelargonium graveolens L'Her. indigenous
 Pelargonium grenvilleae (Andrews) Harv. endemic
 Pelargonium greytonense J.J.A.van der Walt, endemic
 Pelargonium griseum R.Knuth, endemic
 Pelargonium grossularioides (L.) L'Her. indigenous
 Pelargonium hantamianum R.Knuth, endemic
 Pelargonium hemicyclicum Hutch. & C.A.Sm. endemic
 Pelargonium hermanniifolium (P.J.Bergius) Jacq. endemic
 Pelargonium heterophyllum Jacq. endemic
 Pelargonium hirtipetalum E.M.Marais, endemic
 Pelargonium hirtum (Burm.f.) Jacq. endemic
 Pelargonium hispidum (L.f.) Willd. endemic
 Pelargonium hypoleucum Turcz. endemic
 Pelargonium hystrix Harv. endemic
 Pelargonium incarnatum (L'Her.) Moench, endemic
 Pelargonium incrassatum (Andrews) Sims, indigenous
 Pelargonium inquinans (L.) L'Her. endemic
 Pelargonium iocastum (Eckl. & Zeyh.) Steud. endemic
 Pelargonium ionidiflorum (Eckl. & Zeyh.) Steud. endemic
 Pelargonium karooicum Compton & P.E.Barnes, endemic
 Pelargonium keerombergense M.Becker & F.Albers, endemic
 Pelargonium klinghardtense R.Knuth, indigenous
 Pelargonium laciniatum R.Knuth, endemic
 Pelargonium ladysmithianum R.Knuth, endemic
 Pelargonium laevigatum (L.f.) Willd. indigenous
 Pelargonium laevigatum (L.f.) Willd. subsp. diversifolium (J.C.Wendl.) Schonken, endemic
 Pelargonium laevigatum (L.f.) Willd. subsp. laevigatum, endemic
 Pelargonium laevigatum (L.f.) Willd. subsp. oxyphyllum (DC.) Schonken, endemic
 Pelargonium lanceolatum (Cav.) J.Kern, endemic
 Pelargonium laxum (Sweet) G.Don, indigenous
 Pelargonium laxum (Sweet) G.Don subsp. karooicum M.Becker & F.Albers, endemic
 Pelargonium laxum (Sweet) G.Don subsp. laxum, endemic
 Pelargonium leipoldtii R.Knuth, endemic
 Pelargonium leptum L.Bolus, endemic
 Pelargonium leucophyllum Turcz. endemic
 Pelargonium lobatum (Burm.f.) L'Her. endemic
 Pelargonium longicaule Jacq. indigenous
 Pelargonium longicaule Jacq. var. angustipetalum C.Boucher, endemic
 Pelargonium longicaule Jacq. var. longicaule, endemic
 Pelargonium longiflorum Jacq. endemic
 Pelargonium longifolium (Burm.f.) Jacq. endemic
 Pelargonium luridum (Andrews) Sweet, indigenous
 Pelargonium luteolum N.E.Br. endemic
 Pelargonium luteum (Andrews) G.Don, endemic
 Pelargonium magenteum J.J.A.van der Walt, endemic
 Pelargonium minimum (Cav.) Willd. indigenous
 Pelargonium mollicomum Fourc. endemic
 Pelargonium moniliforme Harv. endemic
 Pelargonium multicaule Jacq. indigenous
 Pelargonium multicaule Jacq. subsp. multicaule, indigenous
 Pelargonium multicaule Jacq. subsp. subherbaceum (R.Knuth) J.J.A.van der Walt, endemic
 Pelargonium multiradiatum J.C.Wendl. endemic
 Pelargonium mutans Vorster, endemic
 Pelargonium myrrhifolium (L.) L'Her. indigenous
 Pelargonium myrrhifolium (L.) L'Her. var. coriandrifolium (L.) Harv. endemic
 Pelargonium myrrhifolium (L.) L'Her. var. myrrhifolium, endemic
 Pelargonium namaquense R.Knuth, accepted as Pelargonium bubonifolium (Andrews) Pers. present
 Pelargonium nanum L'Her. indigenous
 Pelargonium nelsonii Burtt Davy, endemic
 Pelargonium nephrophyllum E.M.Marais, endemic
 Pelargonium nervifolium Jacq. endemic
 Pelargonium nivenii Harv. accepted as Pelargonium dipetalum L'Her. subsp. dipetalum, present
 Pelargonium nummulifolium Salisb. endemic
 Pelargonium oblongatum Harv. endemic
 Pelargonium ocellatum J.J.A.van der Walt, endemic
 Pelargonium ochroleucum Harv. endemic
 Pelargonium odoratissimum (L.) L'Her. indigenous
 Pelargonium oenothera (L.f.) Jacq. endemic
 Pelargonium oreophilum Schltr. endemic
 Pelargonium otaviense R.Knuth, indigenous
 Pelargonium ovale (Burm.f.) L'Her. indigenous
 Pelargonium ovale (Burm.f.) L'Her. subsp. hyalinum Hugo, endemic
 Pelargonium ovale (Burm.f.) L'Her. subsp. ovale, endemic
 Pelargonium ovale (Burm.f.) L'Her. subsp. veronicifolium (Eckl. & Zeyh.) Hugo, endemic
 Pelargonium oxaloides (Burm.f.) Willd. endemic
 Pelargonium pachypodium J.P.Roux, endemic
 Pelargonium pallidoflavum E.M.Marais, endemic
 Pelargonium panduriforme Eckl. & Zeyh. endemic
 Pelargonium paniculatum Jacq. indigenous
 Pelargonium papilionaceum (L.) L'Her. endemic
 Pelargonium parvipetalum E.M.Marais, endemic
 Pelargonium parvirostre R.A.Dyer, endemic
 Pelargonium patulum Jacq. endemic
 Pelargonium patulum Jacq. var. grandiflorum N.van Wyk, endemic
 Pelargonium patulum Jacq. var. patulum, endemic
 Pelargonium patulum Jacq. var. tenuilobum (Eckl. & Zeyh.) Harv. endemic
 Pelargonium peltatum (L.) L'Her. endemic
 Pelargonium petroselinifolium G.Don, endemic
 Pelargonium pillansii Salter, endemic
 Pelargonium pilosellifolium (Eckl. & Zeyh.) Steud. endemic
 Pelargonium pilosum (Andrews) Pers. accepted as Pelargonium petroselinifolium G.Don, present
 Pelargonium pinnatum (L.) L'Her. endemic
 Pelargonium plurisectum Salter, endemic
 Pelargonium polycephalum (E.Mey. ex Harv.) R.Knuth, indigenous
 Pelargonium praemorsum (Andrews) F.Dietr. indigenous
 Pelargonium praemorsum (Andrews) F.Dietr. subsp. praemorsum, endemic
 Pelargonium praemorsum (Andrews) F.Dietr. subsp. speciosum Scheltema, indigenous
 Pelargonium proliferum (Burm.f.) Steud. endemic
 Pelargonium pseudofumarioides R.Knuth, indigenous
 Pelargonium pseudoglutinosum R.Knuth, endemic
 Pelargonium pubipetalum E.M.Marais, endemic
 Pelargonium pulchellum Sims, endemic
 Pelargonium pulcherrimum F.M.Leight. accepted as Pelargonium radiatum (Andrews) Pers. present
 Pelargonium pulverulentum Colvill ex Sweet, endemic
 Pelargonium punctatum (Andrews) Willd. endemic
 Pelargonium quarciticola Meve & E.M.Marais, endemic
 Pelargonium quercifolium (L.f.) L'Her. endemic
 Pelargonium radens H.E.Moore, endemic
 Pelargonium radiatum (Andrews) Pers. endemic
 Pelargonium radicatum Vent. endemic
 Pelargonium radulifolium (Eckl. & Zeyh.) Steud. endemic
 Pelargonium ramosissimum (Cav.) Willd. endemic
 Pelargonium ranunculophyllum (Eckl. & Zeyh.) Baker, indigenous
 Pelargonium rapaceum (L.) L'Her. endemic
 Pelargonium redactum Vorster, indigenous
 Pelargonium reflexipetalum E.M.Marais, endemic
 Pelargonium reflexum (Andrews) Pers. endemic
 Pelargonium rehmannii Szyszyl. accepted as Pelargonium luridum (Andrews) Sweet, present
 Pelargonium reniforme Curtis, indigenous
 Pelargonium reniforme Curtis subsp. reniforme, endemic
 Pelargonium reniforme Curtis subsp. velutinum (Eckl. & Zeyh.) Dreyer, endemic
 Pelargonium reticulatum (Sweet) DC. accepted as Pelargonium auritum (L.) Willd. var. carneum (Harv.) E.M.Marais, present
 Pelargonium revolutum (Andrews) Pers. accepted as Pelargonium chelidonium (Houtt.) DC. present
 Pelargonium ribifolium Jacq. endemic
 Pelargonium riversdalense Knuth, endemic
 Pelargonium rubiginosum E.M.Marais, endemic
 Pelargonium rustii R.Knuth, endemic
 Pelargonium sabulosum E.M.Marais, endemic
 Pelargonium salmoneum R.A.Dyer, endemic
 Pelargonium saxatile J.C.Manning & Goldblatt, endemic
 Pelargonium scabroide R.Knuth, endemic
 Pelargonium scabrum (Burm.f.) L'Her. endemic
 Pelargonium schizopetalum Sweet, endemic
 Pelargonium schlechteri R.Knuth, indigenous
 Pelargonium semitrilobum Jacq. endemic
 Pelargonium senecioides L'Her. endemic
 Pelargonium sericifolium J.J.A.van der Walt, endemic
 Pelargonium setosiusculum R.Knuth, endemic
 Pelargonium setosum (Sweet) DC. endemic
 Pelargonium setulosum Turcz. endemic
 Pelargonium sibthorpiifolium Harv. indigenous
 Pelargonium sidoides DC. indigenous
 Pelargonium spathulatum (Andrews) Pers. accepted as Pelargonium longiflorum Jacq. present
 Pelargonium spinosum Willd. indigenous
 Pelargonium squamulosum R.Knuth, accepted as Pelargonium radicatum Vent. present
 Pelargonium stipulaceum (L.f.) Willd. indigenous
 Pelargonium stipulaceum (L.f.) Willd. subsp. ovato-stipulatum (R.Knuth) Vorster, endemic
 Pelargonium stipulaceum (L.f.) Willd. subsp. stipulaceum, endemic
 Pelargonium sublignosum R.Knuth, endemic
 Pelargonium suburbanum Clifford ex C.Boucher, indigenous
 Pelargonium suburbanum Clifford ex D.A.Boucher subsp. bipinnatifidum Clifford ex D.A.Boucher, endemic
 Pelargonium suburbanum Clifford ex D.A.Boucher subsp. suburbanum, endemic
 Pelargonium sulphureum R.Knuth, accepted as Pelargonium flavidum E.M.Marais, present
 Pelargonium tabulare (Burm.f.) L'Her. endemic
 Pelargonium tenellum (Andrews) G.Don, endemic
 Pelargonium tenuicaule R.Knuth, indigenous
 Pelargonium ternatum (L.f.) Jacq. endemic
 Pelargonium ternifolium Vorster, endemic
 Pelargonium tetragonum (L.f.) L'Her. endemic
 Pelargonium theianthum (Eckl. & Zeyh.) Steud. endemic
 Pelargonium tomentosum Jacq. endemic
 Pelargonium tongaense Vorster, endemic
 Pelargonium torulosum E.M.Marais, endemic
 Pelargonium tragacanthoides Burch. indigenous
 Pelargonium transvaalense R.Knuth, endemic
 Pelargonium triandrum E.M.Marais, endemic
 Pelargonium tricolor Curtis, endemic
 Pelargonium trifidum Jacq. endemic
 Pelargonium trifoliatum Harv. accepted as Pelargonium ternifolium Vorster, present
 Pelargonium trifoliolatum (Eckl. & Zeyh.) E.M.Marais, endemic
 Pelargonium tripalmatum E.M.Marais, endemic
 Pelargonium triphyllum Jacq. endemic
 Pelargonium triste (L.) L'Her. endemic
 Pelargonium tysonii Szyszyl. accepted as Pelargonium proliferum (Burm.f.) Steud. present
 Pelargonium uliginosum J.C.Manning & Euston-Brown, indigenous
 Pelargonium undulatum (Andrews) Pers. endemic
 Pelargonium viciifolium DC. endemic
 Pelargonium vinaceum E.M.Marais, indigenous
 Pelargonium violiflorum (Sweet) DC. endemic
 Pelargonium vitifolium (L.) L'Her. endemic
 Pelargonium weberi E.M.Marais, endemic
 Pelargonium woodii R.Knuth, endemic
 Pelargonium worcesterae R.Knuth, endemic
 Pelargonium xerophyton Schltr. ex R.Knuth, indigenous
 Pelargonium zeyheri Harv. accepted as Pelargonium luridum (Andrews) Sweet, present
 Pelargonium zonale (L.) L'Her. endemic

Sarcocaulon
Genus Sarcocaulon
 Sarcocaulon camdeboense Moffett, accepted as Monsonia camdeboensis (Moffett) F.Albers, endemic
 Sarcocaulon ciliatum Moffett, accepted as Monsonia ciliata (Moffett) F.Albers, indigenous
 Sarcocaulon crassicaule Rehm, accepted as Monsonia crassicaulis (Rehm) F.Albers, indigenous
 Sarcocaulon flavescens Rehm, accepted as Monsonia flavescens (Rehm) F.Albers, indigenous
 Sarcocaulon herrei L.Bolus, accepted as Monsonia herrei (L.Bolus) F.Albers, endemic
 Sarcocaulon inerme Rehm, accepted as Monsonia inermis (Rehm) F.Albers 
 Sarcocaulon l'heritieri Sweet, accepted as Monsonia spinosa L'Her. indigenous
 Sarcocaulon marlothii Engl. accepted as Monsonia marlothii (Engl.) F.Albers 
 Sarcocaulon mossamedense (Welw. ex Oliv.) Hiern, accepted as Monsonia mossamedensis Welw. ex Oliv. 
 Sarcocaulon multifidum E.Mey. ex R.Knuth, accepted as Monsonia multifida E.Mey. indigenous
 Sarcocaulon patersonii (DC.) G.Don, accepted as Monsonia patersonii DC. indigenous
 Sarcocaulon peniculinum Moffett, accepted as Monsonia peniculina (Moffett) F.Albers 
 Sarcocaulon salmoniflorum Moffett, accepted as Monsonia salmoniflora (Moffett) F.Albers, indigenous
 Sarcocaulon vanderietiae L.Bolus, accepted as Monsonia vanderietiae (L.Bolus) F.Albers, endemic

Seymouria
Genus Seymouria
 Seymouria l'heritieri Sweet, accepted as Pelargonium dipetalum L'Her. subsp. dipetalum

Melianthaceae
Family: Melianthaceae,

Bersama
Genus Bersama
 Bersama lucens (Hochst.) Szyszyl. indigenous
 Bersama stayneri E.Phillips, accepted as Bersama tysoniana Oliv. present
 Bersama swinnyi E.Phillips, endemic
 Bersama transvaalensis Turrill, accepted as Bersama tysoniana Oliv. present
 Bersama tysoniana Oliv. indigenous

Greyia
Genus Greyia
 Greyia flanaganii Bolus, endemic
 Greyia radlkoferi Szyszyl. indigenous
 Greyia sutherlandii Hook. & Harv. indigenous

Melianthus
Genus Melianthus
 Melianthus comosus Vahl, indigenous
 Melianthus dregeanus Sond. indigenous
 Melianthus dregeanus Sond. subsp. dregeanus, endemic
 Melianthus dregeanus Sond. subsp. insignis (Kuntze) S.A.Tansley, endemic
 Melianthus elongatus Wijnands, endemic
 Melianthus major L. endemic
 Melianthus minor L. accepted as Melianthus elongatus Wijnands, present
 Melianthus pectinatus Harv. indigenous
 Melianthus pectinatus Harv. subsp. gariepinus (Merxm. & Roessler) S.A.Tansley, indigenous
 Melianthus pectinatus Harv. subsp. pectinatus, indigenous
 Melianthus villosus Bolus, indigenous

References

South African plant biodiversity lists
Geraniales